Gex or GEX may refer to:

People
Amélie Gex (1835–1883), French writer and poet
Émilie Gex-Fabry (born 1986), Swiss ski mountaineer, biologist, and botanist
John Peter De Gex (1809–1887), English barrister and law reporter
Walter J. Gex III (1939–2020), American judge

Places
 Gex, Ain, a commune in France
 Arrondissement of Gex, Ain department, France
 Canton of Gex, Ain department, France
 Le Colomby de Gex, a summit in the French Jura Mountains
 Pays de Gex, a historical region of the Duchy of Savoy, in modern France and Switzerland

Other uses
 Gex (video game series), a video game series by Crystal Dynamics
Gex (video game)
Gex: Enter the Gecko
Gex 3: Deep Cover Gecko
 Bleu de Gex, a type of cheese
 Garre language, with ISO 639-3 code "gex"
 Geelong Airport in Victoria, Australia, with IATA code GEX
 Geometry Expert (GEX), Chinese geometry theorem software
 German Entrepreneurial Index (GEX), a German stock market index

Franco-Provençal-language surnames